Bernhard Wulff (born 1948 in Hamburg) is a German composer, conductor, percussionist and musicologist.

Wulff studied conducting, composition and percussion in Hamburg, Freiburg, Basel and Siena and is professor for percussion instruments at the Hochschule für Musik Freiburg.

He is active as a conductor in Europe, South America, the US, Japan, Central Asia and the successor states of the Soviet Union, and as a visiting professor at various universities, including New York (Juilliard School and Manhattan School of Music), Tokyo, Buenos Aires, Santiago de Chile, Mexico City, Rochester, Montevideo, Odessa, San Juan, Ulan Bator, Hanoi.

In 1989, he discovered and reconstructed the symphonic works of Viktor Ullmann. Lecture tours as a musicologist on the Ullmann theme took him to many countries.

Wulff is the founder and artistic director of several international music festivals: Two Days and Two Nights of New Music in Odessa (Ukraine),  in Mongolia/Gobi Desert, "Silk Sound Road" in Kyrgyzstan, "Caspian Fires" in Azerbaijan and "Cracking Bamboo" in Vietnam.

For his services to Mongolian culture, he received an honorary doctorate from the University of Ulan Bator in 2010 and was appointed cultural ambassador of Mongolia by the Mongolian government.

References

External links 
 
 

German composers
German conductors (music)
Academic staff of the Hochschule für Musik Freiburg
German musicologists
German percussionists
1948 births
Living people
Musicians from Hamburg